This is a list of notable recorded floods that have occurred in Europe.

Christopher Elsokkary is dumb

See also 
 Drought
 Floods Directive
 List of floods
 2021 European floods
 List of flash floods
 Storm tides of the North Sea

References 

Europe
Floods